Adam Łomnicki (28 June 1935 – 15 December 2021) was a Polish evolutionary biologist and ecologist, a member of Polish Academy of Sciences, Polish Academy of Learning and Academia Europaea, professor of Mammal Research Institute of the Polish Academy of Sciences.

Biography
Łomnicki graduated in Biology from the Jagiellonian University. He received his PhD from zoology and ecology in 1961, since 1981 he is a professor. In his scientific research he worked on levels of natural selection, stability and its evolutionary constraints, individual-based approach in ecology, intra-population variability, laboratory populations and nature conservation.

He was awarded with a Knight's Cross of the Order of Polonia Restituta.

Łomnicki died on 15 December 2021, at the age of 86.

References

1935 births
2021 deaths
Evolutionary biologists
Polish ecologists
People from Warsaw
Members of the Polish Academy of Sciences
Members of the Polish Academy of Learning
Members of Academia Europaea
Jagiellonian University alumni
Knights of the Order of Polonia Restituta